Sean Singer (born 1974 in Guadalajara, Mexico) is an American poet.
His book  Discography won the Yale Series of Younger Poets Competition and the Norma Farber First Book Award in 2001. His second book Honey & Smoke was published by Eyewear Publishing in 2015. His third book, Today in the Taxi, will be published by Tupelo Press in 2022.

Life 
He graduated from Indiana University, and from Washington University in St. Louis. He lives in New York City. He maintains a daily newsletter on thinking through poetry called The Sharpener.

Published works
 
 Honey & smoke  London : Eyewear Publishing Ltd, 2015. ,

References

External links
 Sean Singer, Interview, GenJ
 Official website

Living people
American male poets
Mexican emigrants to the United States
Writers from Guadalajara, Jalisco
Washington University in St. Louis alumni
Indiana University alumni
Binghamton University faculty
Hunter College faculty
William Paterson University faculty
Northern Arizona University faculty
Barnard College faculty
1974 births
Yale Younger Poets winners
21st-century American poets
21st-century American male writers